Buddha Institute of Dental Sciences and Hospital (BIDSH) is a private dental college located at Kankarbagh in Patna, in the Indian state of Bihar. It is affiliated with the Magadh University and is recognized by Dental Council of India. It offers Bachelor of Dental Science (BDS) and Master of Dental Science (MDS) courses.

References

Dental colleges in India
Colleges affiliated to Magadh University
Universities and colleges in Bihar
Education in Patna
1984 establishments in Bihar
Educational institutions established in 1984